Pierre Bressinck (22 May 1906 – 26 January 1988) - was a Belgian wrestler. He competed in the men's freestyle featherweight at the 1928 Summer Olympics.

References

External links
 

1906 births
1988 deaths
Belgian male sport wrestlers
Olympic wrestlers of Belgium
Wrestlers at the 1928 Summer Olympics
Place of birth missing